Thirupuram is a village in Thiruvananthapuram district in the state of Kerala, India.

Thirupuram village is 6 km away from Neyyattinkara, 25 km away from the capital city Thiruvananthapuram.  The famous Thirupuram Siva Temple is situated here.  Thirupuram is also very near to the Poovar, Vizhinjam and Kovalam.  This village is known for its celebration of the Sivarathri festival. 
It is believed that this is the place where lord Siva sits after the Thripura dahanam.  Thus the village got the name Thripuram which later got changed to Thirupuram.

Demographics
As of 2001 India census, Thirupuram had a population of 38373 with 18925 males and 19448 females.

References

Villages in Thiruvananthapuram district